Never Say You Can't Survive is a studio album by Curtis Mayfield.

Track listing

Note that track 8, "Sparkle", is also on the Mayfield-written and produced soundtrack to the 1976 film Sparkle.

Personnel
Curtis Mayfield - vocals, lead guitar
Gary Thompson - rhythm guitar
Joseph Scott - bass
Floyd Morris, Rich Tufo - keyboards
Donnell Hagan - drums
Henry Gibson - bongos, congas
Cliff Davis, Sonny Seals - tenor saxophone
Kitty and the Haywoods - backing vocals
James Mack, Rich Tufo - arrangements

References

1977 albums
Curtis Mayfield albums
Albums produced by Curtis Mayfield
Curtom Records albums